Álvaro Bustos Sandoval (born 26 June 1995), is a Spanish footballer who plays for AD Alcorcón as a winger.

Club career
Born in Gijón, Asturias, Bustos graduated with Sporting de Gijón's youth setup. He made his senior debuts with the reserves in the 2011–12 campaign, aged only 16, in Segunda División B.

On 10 September 2014 Bustos made his professional debut, starting in a 1–3 home loss against Real Valladolid for the season's Copa del Rey. He continued to appear exclusively for the B's, however.

On 4 August 2016, Bustos was loaned to Segunda División club CD Mirandés, in a season-long deal. He scored his first professional goals on 25 September, netting a double in a 3–2 home win against CD Tenerife.

On 27 July 2017, after suffering relegation, Bustos terminated his contract with Sporting. The following day, he signed a four-year contract with Gimnàstic de Tarragona, still in the second division.

Bustos joined RCD Mallorca in January 2018. After achieving promotion to the second division, he served loan stints at CF Rayo Majadahonda and Pontevedra CF before joining the latter club permanently on 14 July 2019.

On 15 August 2020, Bustos agreed to a two-year contract with Racing de Santander, recently relegated to the third division. On 15 July 2022, after achieving promotion back to the second level, he moved to AD Alcorcón.

Career statistics

References

External links

1995 births
Living people
Footballers from Gijón
Spanish footballers
Association football wingers
Segunda División players
Primera Federación players
Segunda División B players
Sporting de Gijón B players
Sporting de Gijón players
CD Mirandés footballers
Gimnàstic de Tarragona footballers
RCD Mallorca players
CF Rayo Majadahonda players
Pontevedra CF footballers
Racing de Santander players
AD Alcorcón footballers
Spain youth international footballers